Abderraouf El-Fassy (born 11 April 1940) is a Moroccan fencer. He competed in the individual and team foil and épée events at the 1960 Summer Olympics.

References

External links
 

1940 births
Living people
Moroccan male épée fencers
Olympic fencers of Morocco
Fencers at the 1960 Summer Olympics
People from Salé
Moroccan male foil fencers
20th-century Moroccan people